Eucalyptus tephroclada, also known as Holleton mallee, is a species of mallee that is endemic to the southwest of Western Australia. It has smooth bark, lance-shaped adult leaves, flower buds in pendent groups of nine to thirteen, pale lemon yellow flowers and barrel-shaped to cup-shaped fruit.

Description
It has smooth, reddish, brownish and grey bark and branchlets covered with white, powdery granules. Flowering occurs from October to February and the flowers are pale lemony yellow.

Taxonomy and naming
Eucalyptus tephroclada was first formally described in 1992 by Lawrie Johnson and Ken Hill in the journal Telopea from specimens collected near Bruce Rock in 1986. The specific epithet (tephroclada) is from ancient Greek words meaning "ash-grey" and "twig", referring to the powdery covering on the twigs.

Distribution and habitat
This mallee grows in woodland with scattered mallee scrubs in scattered places between Quairading, Southern Cross, Kukerin and Hyden.

Conservation status
This eucalypt is classified as "not threatened" by the Western Australian Government Department of Parks and Wildlife.

See also
List of Eucalyptus species

References

Eucalypts of Western Australia
tephroclada
Myrtales of Australia
Plants described in 1992
Taxa named by Lawrence Alexander Sidney Johnson
Taxa named by Ken Hill (botanist)